Kamran Murtaza is a Pakistani politician and has the status of a Senior Advocate of the Supreme Court of Pakistan. He is currently serving as Senator of Pakistan from Balochistan Province for the term 2021 - 2027. He also remained in office as a Senator from 2003-2009. His political affiliation is with (MMA) Jamiat Ulema-e-Islam (F). He is the founder of Kamran Law Associates.

He was granted status of the 'Senior Advocate of the Supreme Court of Pakistan' on merit in note of his contributions as a lawyer. He holds 126 Reported Judgments to his name and contributed to 390 unprecedented legal issues in his career. He has also served in following notable legal positions:

 The 59th Vice-Chairman Pakistan Bar Council (2018-2019)
 Member Pakistan Bar council (2016-2021)
 16th President Supreme Court Bar Association of Pakistan (2013-2014)
 Ex-Vice Chairman Balochistan Bar Council
 Former Member Judicial Commission
 Honorary Vice-Chancellor of various Universities.

References

Living people
Pakistani Senators 2021–2027
Jamiat Ulema-e-Islam (F) politicians
Pakistani lawyers
Presidents of the Supreme Court Bar Association of Pakistan
Year of birth missing (living people)